Judas is a 1930 Soviet silent drama film directed by Evgeniy Ivanov-Barkov.

Cast
 Aleksandr Antonov 
 Boris Ferdinandov
 Vasili Kovrigin 
 Emma Tsesarskaya

References

Bibliography 
 Christie, Ian & Taylor, Richard. The Film Factory: Russian and Soviet Cinema in Documents 1896-1939. Routledge, 2012.

External links 
 

1930 films
Soviet drama films
Russian drama films
Soviet silent films
1930s Russian-language films
Soviet black-and-white films
1930 drama films
Films about Orthodoxy
Russian black-and-white films
Russian silent films
Silent drama films